South Carolina Highway 253 (SC 253) is a  primary state highway in the U.S. state of South Carolina. It runs in Greenville and is the gateway to Paris Mountain State Park and runs from Parker to Tigerville.

Route description
It then moves up to Sulphur Springs Road where the road changes to East Blue Ridge Drive before intersecting at Poinsett Highway on U.S. Highway 276 (US 276) before running concurrently on SC 291 as North Pleasantburg Drive for  before turning left at Paris Mountain Road. After traveling  and passing Greenvista Drive, SC 253 becomes East Mountain Creek Road and traveling and additional  before intersecting with SC 290. SC 253 then turns left and goes  before terminating at SC 414 in Tigerville.

History

SC 253 started in 1939 at the intersection of US 25 and US 276 to form an  highway around Paris Mountain State Park, ending around Travelers Rest. Nine years later, SC 253 was reduced to secondary status with part of the road becoming county roads S-23-22. The road was resurrected in 1950 as a north-south road to Tigerville. In 1965, SC 253 was extended to SC 250 which is now part of US 25 and then extended southwest again between 1968 and 1970 to its current terminus at SC 124.

Improvements to the road include the road being fully paved in 1941 or 1942, being four-laned with SC 291 between 1968 and 1970, and four-laned again for a distance south of US 276 in 1977.

Major intersections

See also

References

External links

The Highways of South Carolina: SC 253

253
Transportation in Greenville County, South Carolina